The Military Decoration for Exceptional Service or Acts of Courage or Devotion is awarded to personnel of the Belgian Armed Forces for either displayed herorism or for display of extraordinary devotion to duty. In history, sometimes it is referred to as an 'Article 4' award, as originally, the medal was created as a variation of the military decoration for long service. However, nowadays, both medals are distinct awards, albeit still having the same guilt cross.

Award Criteria 
During both World wars, the medal was almost exclusively awarded for acts of bravery and thus extremely rare. In the period 2009-2013, the Military Decoration for Exceptional Service or Acts of Courage or Devotion second class was awarded 58 times. During the same period, the Military Decoration for Exceptional Service or Acts of Courage or Devotion first class was not awarded.
Presently, the award of the medal is a bit more common as it is more often awarded for exceptional service. Examples of awards for exceptional service are the automatic award of the medal to navy personnel below the rank of officer for 20 years of service on board of Navy vessels or the award of 72 medals to military personnel engaged in the Non Combatant Evacuation Operation (NEO) Red Kite in 2021.
The medal can be awarded in 2 classes. Usually, only the second class of the medal is awarded.
The first class of the medal is awarded for very exceptional heroism or devotion. Only commissioned and non-commissioned officers are eligible to the first class of the medal.

Award description 
The medal is a gilt cross pattée surmounted by the royal crown of Belgium with four rays between the cross arms.  The obverse bears a circular central medallion with a lion and the circular relief inscription "L'UNION FAIT LA FORCE" (STRENGTH IN UNITY).  The reverse is identical except for the central medallion, the center bears the royal monogram of the reigning monarch at time of award surrounded by the relief inscription  "ARMÉE * MÉRITE * ANCIENNETÉ" ("ARMY * MERIT * SENIORITY").
It hangs from a red silk moiré ribbon with narrow longitudinal gold and black stripes near the edges.

Devices 
An inverted gilt chevron is worn on the ribbon, denoting award of the medal "first class".
During the World Wars, the medal was sometimes awarded with a silver palm, worn on the ribbon denoting awards during wartime. The silver palm device is currently obsolete.

See also
 List of Orders, Decorations and Medals of the Kingdom of Belgium

 Belgian order of precedence (decorations and medals)

References 

 Clarke JD,Gallantry Medals & Awards of the World
 Royal Decree of 23 December 1873 creating the Military Decoration
 Belgian military regulation DGHR-REG-DISPSYS-001 of 20 February 2006
 Quinot H., 1950, Recueil illustré des décorations belges et congolaises, 4e Edition. (Hasselt)
 Cornet R., 1982, Recueil des dispositions légales et réglementaires régissant les ordres nationaux belges. 2e Ed. N.pl.,  (Brussels)
 Borné A.C., 1985, Distinctions honorifiques de la Belgique, 1830-1985 (Brussels)
 Report of written questions and answers in the Belgian House of Representatives, 17 March 2014 (QRVA 53-152)

External links
 Belgian Military Decoration at Northeastmedals

Military awards and decorations of Belgium
Awards established in 1873